The China Theater Awards (中国戏剧奖) are presented by the China Theater Association, and were established in 2005. This bi-annual event is China's equivalent to the Tony Awards, and comprises the Plum Blossom Prize (梅花奖) for stage performance (founded in 1983) and the Cao Yu Theater Award (曹禺戏剧奖) for writing (founded in 1981).

Awards Categories
 China Theater Award for Outstanding Play
 China Theater Award for Outstanding Directing
 China Theater Award for Outstanding Music

Cao Yu Theater Award
 Cao Yu Theater Award for Outstanding Writing

Plum Blossom Prizes
 Plum Blossom Prize for Outstanding Performance in a China Opera
 Plum Blossom Prize for Outstanding Performance in a Play
 Plum Blossom Prize for Outstanding Performance in an Opera

References

External links
 China Theater Awards
 CFLAC Official Page

Awards established in 2005